Education Minister of Denmark, or Minister of Education in Denmark, is a Danish minister office currently held by Mattias Tesfaye in the Frederiksen II Cabinet.

The office was created in 1916 when the post Kultus Minister was split up into the posts of Education Minister and Church Minister. The new Church Minister also took over the responsibility for culture from the Culture Minister, a task later transferred to the Minister for Cultural Affairs in 1961. Upon the accession of the Thorning-Schmidt I Cabinet on 3 October 2011 the title was changed from Minister of Education to Minister of Children and Education and on 9 August 2013 the title was changed back to Minister of Education.

List of Ministers

References
50 Education Ministers – From the Danish Ministry of Education.

External links 

Lists of government ministers of Denmark
Government ministerial offices of Denmark